The 2017–18 Premier 15s was the inaugural season for the Premier 15s and began on 16 September, 2017. Saracens Women won the inaugural Championship after defeating Harlequins Ladies in their final 24–20.

Teams

Table 

Source: RFU

Regular season

Round 1

Round 2

Round 3

Round 4

Round 5

Round 6

Round 7

Round 8

Round 9

Round 10

Round 11

Round 12

Round 13

Round 14

Round 15

Round 16

Round 17

Round 18

Play-offs

Semi-finals

1st leg

2nd leg

Final

References

External links 

 

Premier 15s